Kimberley Brownlee (born June 4, 1978) is a Canadian philosopher. She holds a Canada Research Chair in Ethics at the University of British Columbia. Previously, she was a Professor of Philosophy at the University of Warwick. She is known for her works on conscience, conviction, civil disobedience, the ethics of sociability, ideals, virtue, practical reason, and human rights.
Brownlee is a winner of the Philip Leverhulme Prize.

Books
 Being Social: The Philosophy of Social Human Rights, with Adam Neal and David Jenkins (eds.), Oxford University Press, 2022
 Being Sure of Each Other: An Essay on Social Rights, Oxford University Press, 2020
 The Blackwell Companion to Applied Philosophy, with Kasper Lippert-Rasmussen and David Coady (eds.) Wiley Press, 2016
Conscience and Conviction: The Case for Civil Disobedience, Oxford University Press, 2012. 
 Disability and Disadvantage, with Adam Cureton (eds.), Oxford University Press, 2009

References

External links
Kimberley Brownlee at the University of Warwick

Canadian philosophers
Philosophy academics
Living people
1978 births
Academics of the University of Warwick
Alumni of the University of Oxford
Alumni of the University of Cambridge
McGill University alumni
Canada Research Chairs
Academic staff of the University of British Columbia